Kennedy Osei (born 21 October 1966) is a retired Ghanaian middle-distance runner who specialized in the 800 metres.

He won the bronze medal at the 1991 All-Africa Games. He also competed at the World Championships in 1993 and 1997 as well as the World Indoor Championships in 1993 and 1997, reaching the semifinals on each occasion.

Personal bests
800 metres - 1:45.13 min (1994) - national record.
1500 metres - 3:47.10 min (1993) - national record is 3:46.62 min.

References

External links
 

1966 births
Living people
Ghanaian male middle-distance runners
Athletes (track and field) at the 1992 Summer Olympics
Olympic athletes of Ghana
Fenerbahçe athletes
African Games bronze medalists for Ghana
African Games medalists in athletics (track and field)
Commonwealth Games competitors for Ghana
Athletes (track and field) at the 1994 Commonwealth Games
Athletes (track and field) at the 1991 All-Africa Games